Futbolo klubas Atmosfera, commonly known as Atmosfera, is a Lithuanian football club located in Mažeikiai, in Mažeikiai District. They currently play in the I Lyga, the second tier of Lithuanian football. FK Atmosfera is a phoenix club of Atmosfera Mažeikiai.

History
Mažeikiai has a deep history of football. Since mid 20th century there was a football club that competed at the top tier of the Lithuanian SSR football league, and achieved two championship titles during that time. This club was eventually named Atmosfera Mažeikiai, and existed between 1973—1990. 

The name Atmosfera in Lithuanian language means an atmosphere, a legacy to clubs association to manufacturing industry that supported the club.

Between 1990 and 2012, several clubs in Mažeikiai rose up and fell apart, mostly due to financial circumstances. After FK Mažeikiai went bankrupt in 2012, a new football club was formed in Mažeikiai, and in honor of the past club was called FK Atmosfera.

The team played in II Lyga (3rd tier) from 2013. The club struggled, and did not play in any championship in 2016. The club returned to II Lyga (3rd tier) in 2017. The 2018 season saw the team to rise to 3rd position, and they were successful to gain license to I Lyga.

In the 2019 LFF I Lyga, FK Atmosfera finished in 14th position. The team is expected to continue to play in the I Lyga in the 2020 season.

Honours

Domestic
  II Lyga Western Zone
 3rd place: 2018

Recent seasons

Kit evoliution

Colors 
 2012 – now.

Stadium
Club play their home matches in Mažeikiai Stadium. The current capacity of the stadium is 2,400 seats.

Current squad 

|-----
! colspan="9" bgcolor="#B0D3FB" align="left" |
|----- bgcolor="#DFEDFD"

|-----
! colspan="9" bgcolor="#B0D3FB" align="left" |

|----- bgcolor="#DFEDFD"

|-----
! colspan="9" bgcolor="#B0D3FB" align="left" |
|----- bgcolor="#DFEDFD"

References

External links
  
 Facebook
 1lyga.lt 
 Soccerway
 Globalsportsarchive

Football clubs in Lithuania
Association football clubs established in 2012
Phoenix clubs (association football)